Kiwaia dividua is a moth in the family Gelechiidae. It was described by Philpott in 1921. It is found in New Zealand.

The wingspan is 9–12 mm. The forewings are brownish-grey with a black central streak from the base to before half, attenuated apically, sometimes margined beneath with ochreous. There is a similar streak commencing slightly above and beyond the basal streak and continuing to apex, evenly widening from the acute base. The hindwings are shining grey-whitish.

References

Kiwaia
Moths described in 1921